The 2017 OPPO International Championship was a professional ranking snooker tournament that took place from 29 October to 5 November 2017 in Daqing, China. It was the eighth ranking event of the 2017/2018 season.

Qualifying for the tournament took place between 26 and 30 September 2017 in Preston.

Mark Selby was the defending champion, having beaten Ding Junhui 10–1 in the 2016 final. Selby retained his title by beating Mark Allen 10–7 in the final of this year's edition.

Kyren Wilson made the 133rd official maximum break in the 10th frame of his last 32 match against Martin Gould. It was Wilson's first professional maximum break.

Prize fund
The breakdown of prize money for this year is shown below:

 Winner: £150,000
 Runner-up: £75,000
 Semi-final: £32,000
 Quarter-final: £21,500
 Last 16: £13,500
 Last 32: £8,500
 Last 64: £4,000

 Televised highest break: £3,000
 Total: £750,000

The "rolling 147 prize" for a maximum break stood at £5,000

Main draw

Notes

Final

Qualifying
These matches were held between 26 September and 29 September 2017 at the Preston Guild Hall in Preston, England. Matches involving top players Mark Selby, John Higgins, Ding Junhui and Liang Wenbo were held-over to the main venue, as well as matches involving Chinese players who participated in 2017 Asian Indoor and Martial Arts Games: Zhou Yuelong, Zhao Xintong, Yan Bingtao and Lyu Haotian. These were played on 29 October 2017 in China. All matches were best of 11 frames.

Century breaks

Qualifying stage centuries

Total: 39

 134  James Wattana
 133  Xiao Guodong
 133  Anthony McGill
 129, 116, 111  Stephen Maguire
 129  Mark Williams
 128  Gary Wilson
 127, 108  Barry Hawkins
 127  Tian Pengfei
 126  Marco Fu
 126  Kyren Wilson
 124  Chris Wakelin
 122  Zhang Yong
 121  Neil Robertson
 120  Tom Ford
 118  Stuart Bingham
 117  Alfie Burden
 117  Kurt Maflin
 115  Noppon Saengkham

 113  Scott Donaldson
 112  Ronnie O'Sullivan
 110  Martin O'Donnell
 109  Judd Trump
 108  Thor Chuan Leong
 108  Robert Milkins
 108  Mark Allen
 107  Zhang Anda
 106  Jamie Jones
 105  Soheil Vahedi
 104  Shaun Murphy
 104  Jimmy Robertson
 103  Matthew Selt
 102  Cao Yupeng
 101  Michael White
 100  Martin Gould
 100  David Grace
 100  Ben Woollaston

Televised stage centuries

Total: 75

 147, 127, 101  Kyren Wilson
 141, 111  Jimmy Robertson
 138, 123  Shaun Murphy
 137, 131, 117, 114, 110, 105, 102, 100  Mark Allen
 136, 136, 131, 128, 106  Ali Carter
 135, 127, 127, 118, 115, 110, 109, 105  Judd Trump
 133, 122, 114  Kurt Maflin
 131  Robin Hull
 129, 122, 121, 117, 104, 101  Neil Robertson
 129, 127, 119, 115, 108, 102  Mark Selby
 129  Peter Ebdon
 128, 105, 104  Martin Gould
 127  Zhao Xintong
 126, 103  Xiao Guodong

 125, 112  Luca Brecel
 123, 103, 100  Yan Bingtao
 121, 101  Mark Williams
 118, 109, 103, 100  Martin O'Donnell
 118, 104  Liang Wenbo
 118  Ryan Day
 116, 114, 102  Jack Lisowski
 115  Matthew Selt
 114, 113  John Higgins
 111  Ronnie O'Sullivan
 106  Robbie Williams
 101  Sanderson Lam
 100  Ricky Walden

References

2017
2017 in snooker
2017 in Chinese sport
Sport in Daqing
October 2017 sports events in China
November 2017 sports events in China